The edimmu or ekimmu, were a type of utukku in the Mesopotamian religion of Sumer, Akkad, Assyria and Babylonia,  similar in nature to the preta of the Hindu religions or the Jiangshan of Chinese mythology.  They were envisioned as the ghosts of those who were not buried properly.  They were considered vengeful toward the living and might possess people if they did not respect certain taboos, such as the prohibition against eating ox meat.  They were thought to cause disease and inspire criminal behavior in the living, but could sometimes be appeased by funeral repasts or libations.  The edimmu were also thought to be completely or nearly incorporeal, "wind" spirits that sucked the life out of the susceptible and the sleeping (most commonly the young).

In modern fiction

Games
 The magazine Dragon #25 (May 1979) includes ekimmu in an article which describes them as a form of a vampire and give stats for them to use for Dungeons & Dragons. They are described as being able to stay invisible, even while they are attacking.
 The 1990 role-playing game "Night Life" offers Ekimmu as an NPC Race (and an optional selection for the player character's undead race selection at the start of the game). They are described as being created "when someone vows to look after the grave of the deceased and then fails to."
 The ekimmas are a species of vampires in the 2015 game The Witcher 3: The Wild Hunt. They are depicted as large bat-like bipedal creatures that can turn partially invisible and haunt dungeons and ruins.
 Edimmus are monsters featured in the videogame RuneScape.

Graphic novel

 In Hellblazer volume 22, Constantine is given the skin of a 200-year old ekimmu  by another ekimmu named Julian who has taken on the appearance of a pre-teen British schoolgirl. He heats it up and makes a salve to rub on the scabs of a skin condition he gets because of something which happened in Liverpool. It is said to be similar to an opiate and helps the pain.

References 

Ghosts
Mesopotamian demons